Stone Mills Union Church is a historic church at Stone Mills in Jefferson County, New York. It was built in 1837.

The church is a long, three bay, rectangular structure built of carefully dressed walls of gray limestone. It is covered by a gable roof and the front elevation features a two-story pedimented pavilion two bays in width. Atop the pavilion is a simple belfry covered by a low pyramidal roof. It was listed on the National Register of Historic Places in 1976.

Since 1968 it has served as headquarters for the Stone Mill Museum of the Northern New York Agricultural Historical Society. The museum includes a sawmill, granary, school house, display buildings and farm machinery.

References

External links
Stone Mills Museum - Northern New York Agricultural Historical Society

Churches on the National Register of Historic Places in New York (state)
Churches completed in 1837
19th-century churches in the United States
Churches in Jefferson County, New York
Museums in Jefferson County, New York
History museums in New York (state)
Agriculture museums in the United States
National Register of Historic Places in Jefferson County, New York